Hubert Buchberger (born 1951, in Frankfurt) is a German violinist, conductor and music university teacher. He teaches at the Frankfurt Academy of Music, and in 1985, he became an honorary professor.

Buchberger studied from 1970 to 1977, at the Frankfurt University of Music and Performing Arts with Heinz Stanske and Günther Weigmann.

In 1974, he was a founding member of the Buchberger Quartet, as lead violinist. In 1978 and 1979, the quartet was winner of the national selection of Young Artists of the German Music Council, and won international competitions in Portsmouth, Hanover and Evian. Since 1974, he heads the Offenbach Chamber Orchestra. He has recorded with the Hessian Youth Symphony Orchestra.

Discography
Haydn String Quartets

References

1951 births
Living people
Musicians from Frankfurt
German violinists
German male violinists
21st-century violinists
21st-century German male musicians